Shimoni is a port village and tourist destination in southeastern Kenya near the border with Tanzania and directly across from Wasini Island.

General Information 

This small town is known for its British colonial ruins and slave caves which are the focus of attraction for several community-based projects. In addition, the Shimoni forest, coast, and marine ecosystems are an ever-present attraction. Therefore, it is no surprise that Kenya Wildlife Service's headquarters for the Kisite-Mpunguti Marine Protected Area is located in Shimoni.

In certain seasons, the aromatic smell of cloves permeates the evening calls to prayer in the town's two main mosques. Still, Shimoni is a relatively religiously diverse area, with a substantial minority of Christians. Additionally, the villagers are aware of the benefits behind the tourism industry and thus are often very gracious and welcoming to tourists. Many villagers own and operate businesses that cater to tourists. However, the majority of the population still relies heavily upon traditional fishing, subsistence farming, and exploiting forest resources.

Currently, Shimoni, while rural, still has access to electricity and wireless internet (which is not free). While there are no banks or ATMs in Shimoni, there are four M-PESA agents along the main roads and one post office. Additionally, there is a new internet cafe that was established in early April, 2012, called Bum Bum's. Bum Bum's uses an eithernet connection with 4 computers. It also offers a wireless connection and access to a web cam upon request. While several wells exist in the village, and bottled water is often sold in the dukas and shops along the main roads, Shimoni lacks a reliable supply of fresh water.

There are at least five schools in Shimoni: Matunda Bora (Meaning, 'Good Fruit,' in Swahili), Shimoni Primary School, Base Academy, Shining Star Academy and Shimoni Secondary School.
There is a Deaf school, "Kichakamkwaju Unit for the Deaf" located about 4 km north from Shimoni village, located in the Kichakamkwaju Primary School compound. Both are administered by the Kenya Ministry of Education. A dormitory building provides eight sewing machines, and are sponsored by Kenya Kesho, Go See Kenya and Charlie Claw's.

History 

Starting in the 1750s, Shimoni, along with Malindi, Mombasa and other coastal cities and towns, was a primary, 'slave holding port,' for east Africa's coastal slave trade which reached from South Africa to the Middle East. These slave holding pens were located in the natural cave systems that exist in Shimoni. Currently, visitors are granted access to the Shimoni Slave Caves during the guided tour by members of the Shimoni Slave Cave Committee.

In 1857, the British parliament enacted an international ban on the slave trade. In the 1870s, British parliament was successful in convincing Barghash ibn Sa'id, the Sultan of Zanzibar, to acknowledge the ban. This edict choked the trafficking of slaves to and from Zanzibar, effectively cutting off Shimoni's relevance in the slave trade.

In the 1880s, British colonialism began in Shimoni with the arrival of the British Imperial East Africa Company's headquarters. The British Imperial East Africa Company choose Shimoni because it was virtually uninhabited at the time. Many other buildings in Shimoni were built by the very first British colonists of Kenya, including Kenya's first colonial prison (now in ruins).

Over time it has developed from a sleepy fishing village to become the main port of clearance for oceangoing trade Dhows arriving from as far away as the Arab states of the Persian Gulf, the island of Zanzibar and Dar es Salaam.

Conservation 

Kenya Wildlife Service (KWS), in cooperation with privately owned tour dhow operators, try to work together on maintaining and caring for the dolphins that are sighted often within the Wasini Channel, the park, and reserve.

Apart from the Kenya Wildlife Service, there are several community-based organizations in Shimoni that make an effort to raise awareness about maintaining and fostering the health of the coral reef, forest & marine wildlife.

The Shimoni forest is a coastal forest which features jagged, jumbled fossilized coral substrate that is naturally found in the soil. Often referred to as 'coral rag.' It is often mined for building construction projects in and around the village.

Over the past ten years, 70% of the Shimoni forest has been depleted through human activity exploiting its resources. As a result, Friends of Shimoni Forest (FSF) is a conservation organization that works to save the Shimoni Forest from deforestation and land encroachment. FSF raises funds through leading Eco-Trail tours and their gift shop.

SEA is also a conservation organization that focuses upon improving the ways in which the community utilizes materials. 
Currently, SEA has been developing eco-friendly alternatives to charcoal. Charcoal pits are quite common to see in the Shimoni forest; villagers and outside laborers travel to the interior of the forest in order to cut down trees for charcoal. This behavior is an ever-present threat to the forest. In an effort to reduce deforestation, SEA works to create alternative charcoal. Using materials such as coconut shells and paper, SEA creates eco-friendly equivalents to charcoal.

Mangrove trees play a large role in maintaining and preserving Shimoni coastal habitats.

Health 

Shimoni has a relatively well-equipped public dispensary with an approved Public Health Officer to provide exams and vaccinations. The dispensary is also office to an organization called SAFE Shimoni. SAFE Shimoni is an active, dynamic health outreach organization of about 30 individuals (men and women) that travel to schools and community centers in/around Shimoni in an effort to educate and raise awareness. Topics include: hygiene, tuberculosis, puberty, post- and pre-natal health, hospital aftercare, safe sex, Hepatitis B, and HIV/AIDS. Many members of SAFE Shimoni are community health workers based at the dispensary and two members have been trained in emergency first response.

Tourism 

 

The Shimoni Slave Cave tours are one of the primary attractions for Shimoni. It is a historical site and restaurant. As it is a community project, all proceeds go to several other community initiatives: "1) Sponsoring bright poor students. 2) Buying drugs for our local dispensary. 3) Buying food for the deaf unit at Kichakamkwaju. 4) Paying salaries for school and madrasa PTA teachers and other community needs."

Shimoni's tourist attractions include scuba diving centers such as Pilli Pippa and Paradise Divers (located in Mkwiro) which take divers within and outside protected marine areas at Kisite-Mpunguti Marine National Park. 

Lodging choices are Betty's Camp, Shimoni Coral Reef Lodge, and Shimoni Gardens Resort. A little further away is a small no frills gem in the neighboring village, Mwazaro: Mwazaro Mangrove Lodge. The Mwazaro Mangrove Lodge hosts many kite-surfing enthusiasts and offers lessons.

Additionally, Shimoni has many restaurants such as ABC Restaurant and Abdul's Four Tables. Smugglers Bar, Best Bar, and Wayside Bar serves food as well as drinks.

Wasini Island lies 2 km South of Shimoni with Wasini channel separating Wasini from the mainland. Wasini Island's two major villages are Mkwiro and Wasini.

Located on well-stocked fishing grounds, the adjacent Pemba Channel has a worldwide reputation for sports angling. Many of IGFA Kenya, All Africa and World Records are obtained here.

External links

Populated places in Coast Province
Kwale County